Joshua Stuart Hawkes (born 28 January 1999) is an English footballer who plays for EFL League Two club Tranmere Rovers.

Playing career

Hartlepool United 
Hawkes was drafted into the First Team picture in February 2017 after impressing then-boss Dave Jones whilst still a scholar. He made his first senior appearance coming on as a late substitute for Michael Woods in a 4–0 win for Hartlepool against Crewe Alexandra. In March 2017, Hawkes signed his first professional contract with Hartlepool, along with Ryan Catterick, Kenton Richardson and Aaron Cunningham.

Hawkes joined Northern League Division One side Dunston UTS on loan in November 2017. He scored twice in four appearances during this short-term loan deal. Hawkes enjoyed his first extended spell in the first team under Matthew Bates and scored his first goal in professional football in a 2–1 win over Bromley in March 2018. He finished the 2017–18 season with two goals in twelve appearances.

Hawkes continued his positive form into the 2018–19 season. After an extended spell out of the team, Hawkes regained his place after scoring the consolation goal in a 2–1 defeat at Dover Athletic. He finished the season with nine goals in thirty-one appearances, including winning goals against Maidenhead United, Braintree Town and Wrexham.

Sunderland 
On 15 September 2020, Hawkes signed for Sunderland on a two-year deal. He scored his first goal for the club in an EFL Cup tie against Port Vale on 10 August 2021. On 11 January 2022, Hawkes made his League debut against Lincoln City in a 3–1 Defeat.

Tranmere Rovers 
On 2 September 2021, Hawkes joined League Two side Tranmere Rovers on a season-long loan deal. On 7 January 2022, Hawkes returned to Sunderland along with teammates Jack Diamond and Anthony Patterson following a COVID-19 outbreak in the Sunderland first team. On 25 January 2022, he returned to Tranmere Rovers on a permanent deal, signing a contract until the summer of 2024.

Career statistics

References

English footballers
English Football League players
National League (English football) players
1999 births
Living people
Hartlepool United F.C. players
Marske United F.C. players
Dunston UTS F.C. players
Sunderland A.F.C. players
Tranmere Rovers F.C. players
Association football midfielders